Jordan Williams (born 4 June 1997) is an English rugby league footballer who plays as a prop or second-row forward for the London Broncos in the RFL Championship.

He has previously played for the London Skolars in the RFL League 1.

Background 
Williams was born in Stevenage, Hertfordshire and grew up in the North Hertfordshire market town of Hitchin.

Career

Early career 
Williams played rugby union as a youth for an amateur rugby union club in Hitchin before transitioning over to rugby league with the North Herts Crusaders. Following this he went on to play for the North London representative team in the London Origin rugby league series. From there he was scouted by the London Broncos and progressed through the London Broncos Academy system from 2015 - 2017.

London Skolars 
Williams joined the London Skolars in 2017 ahead of the 2017 League 1 season. He spent three seasons at the New River Stadium, featuring prominently, playing 38 times and scoring 12 tries.

London Broncos 
After a successful 2019 season in North London, achieving top try scorer for the Skolars, Williams signed for the London Broncos first team at the end of 2019 and made his debut at home on 9 February 2020 against Whitehaven.

Jordan Williams' Heritage Number is 639.

Club statistics

Honours 
 London Skolars Player's Player of the year 2019
 London Skolars Supporter's Player of the year 2019

References

External links 

 Jordan Williams LinkedIn Profile
 London Broncos profile
 Williams signs for London Broncos
 Jordan Williams stats

1997 births
Living people
English rugby league players
Oxford Rugby League players
London Broncos players
London Skolars players
Sportspeople from Hitchin
Rugby league players from Hertfordshire
Rugby league props
Rugby league second-rows